Ginling Literary Awards is an award from Nanjing Provincial People's Government, is a literary creation award of the Nanjing city. The most early literary award of China, selection every three years since 1986.

References

Chinese literary awards
Nanjing